Sonatine is a 1984 Canadian drama film written and directed by Micheline Lanctôt. The film was selected as the Canadian entry for the Best Foreign Language Film at the 57th Academy Awards, but was not accepted as a nominee.

The film centres on two young girls, Chantal (Pascale Bussières) and Louisette (Marcia Pilote), who become disillusioned with the world of adults and plan a suicide pact. Lanctôt structured the film as a triptych, with one segment devoted to each of the two girls as an individual, going through the experiences that cause them to lose faith in humanity, before they plan the suicide pact in the third segment. Lanctôt admitted that she had written the screenplay at a time when she was very depressed.

The film premiered in February 1984 before opening commercially in March.

Cast
 Marcia Pilote as Louisette
 Yves Jacques as The Subway Station Janitor
 Pierre Giard
 Pierre Fauteux as Fernand
 Kliment Dentchev as Bulgarian seaman
 Pascale Bussières as Chantal

Awards 
The film received five Genie Award nominations at the 6th Genie Awards in 1985, for Best Director (Lanctôt), Best Actress (Bussières), Best Screenplay (Lanctôt), Best Costume Design (Hélène Schneider), Best Original Score (François Lanctôt). Micheline Lanctôt won the award for Best Director.

The film won the now-defunct Silver Lion for Best First Film (1983-1987) at the 41st Venice International Film Festival.

See also
 List of submissions to the 57th Academy Awards for Best Foreign Language Film
 List of Canadian submissions for the Academy Award for Best Foreign Language Film

References

External links
 

1984 films
1984 drama films
Canadian drama films
Films directed by Micheline Lanctôt
French-language Canadian films
1980s Canadian films
1980s French-language films